Petricani is a commune in Neamț County, Western Moldavia, Romania. It is composed of four villages: Boiștea, Petricani, Târpești and Țolici.

References

Communes in Neamț County
Localities in Western Moldavia